is a Japanese computer scientist. Currently he is a professor at the University of Tokyo.

Biography

Education 
 1978: Graduated from the Department of Electrical Engineering, University of Tokyo
 1983: Received the degree of Ph.D. from the Department of Computer Science, University of Tokyo

Work 
 1983: Lecturer at the University of Tokyo
 1984: Associate professor

Awards and honours
 2009: SIGMOD Edgar F. Codd Innovations Award
 2013: Medal with Purple Ribbon
 2015: C&C Prize
 2020: IEEE Innovation in Societal Infrastructure Award

References

External links 
 http://www.tkl.iis.u-tokyo.ac.jp/Kilab/Members/memo/kitsure_j.html

Living people
1955 births
Japanese computer scientists
Academic staff of the University of Tokyo
University of Tokyo alumni
Fellows of the Association for Computing Machinery
Fellow Members of the IEEE
Recipients of the Medal with Purple Ribbon